Sir Joseph Amable Thomas Chapais  (March 23, 1858 – July 15, 1946) was a French Canadian author, editor, historian, journalist, professor, and politician.

Born in Saint-Denis, Quebec (then Canada East), the son of Jean-Charles Chapais, a Father of Canadian Confederation, and Henriette-Georgina Dionne, he received a bachelor's degree in 1876 from Université Laval and was called to the Bar of Quebec in 1879.

From 1879 to 1884, he was the principal secretary to the Lieutenant Governor of Quebec, Théodore Robitaille. Turning to journalism, he became the editor-in-chief of the daily newspaper, Le Courrier du Canada in 1884 and from 1890 to 1901 was the owner. From 1907 to 1934, he was a professor of history at Université Laval.

In 1891, he ran unsuccessfully as a Conservative for the House of Commons of Canada in the riding of Kamouraska. He was appointed to the Legislative Council of Quebec in 1892 representing Laurentides. From 1893 to 1894, he was the Leader of the Government. In 1893, he was appointed Minister without Portfolio in the cabinet of Louis-Olivier Taillon. From 1895 to 1897, he was the speaker of the legislative council. From 1896 to 1897, he was the president of the executive council in the cabinet of Edmund James Flynn and was a Cabinet Minister. In 1917, he refused a seat in the Senate but was summoned to the Senate in 1919. A Conservative, he represented the senatorial division of Grandville, Quebec and served until his death in 1946.

From 1936 to 1939 and again from 1944 to 1946, he was the leader of the government in the legislative council. From 1936 to 1938, he was a minister without portfolio in the cabinet of Maurice Duplessis. He was appointed again in 1944.

In 1912, he was made a fellow of the Royal Society of Canada and was its president from 1923 to 1924. From 1925 to 1926, he was the president of the Canadian Historical Association. In 1930, he was a member of the Canadian delegation to the League of Nations. In 1935, he was made a Knight Bachelor by George V.

Parc Thomas-Chapais in Montreal is named in his honour.

Chapais, Quebec is named for him.

Published works
 Congrégations enseignantes et le brevet de capacité (1893)
 Discours et conférences (1895)
 le Serment du roi (1901)
 Jean Talon, intendant de la Nouvelle-France (1904)
 Mélanges de polémique et d'études religieuses, politiques et littéraires (1905)
 le Marquis de Montcalm (1911)
 Mélanges (1915)
 Cours d'histoire du Canada, 1760–1867 (1919)

See also 
 Université Laval

References

External links
 
 
 
 
 
 

1858 births
1946 deaths
Academics in Quebec
Canadian male non-fiction writers
Canadian senators from Quebec
Canadian non-fiction writers in French
Conservative Party of Canada (1867–1942) candidates for the Canadian House of Commons
Fellows of the Royal Society of Canada
Conservative Party of Canada (1867–1942) senators
Journalists from Quebec
Canadian Knights Bachelor
Presidents of the Legislative Council of Quebec
Conservative Party of Quebec MLCs
Historians from Quebec
Université Laval alumni
Persons of National Historic Significance (Canada)
19th-century Canadian historians
20th-century Canadian historians
Academic staff of Université Laval
Presidents of the Canadian Historical Association
19th-century Canadian male writers
20th-century Canadian male writers